The Waterworks Museum is located on the northern side of Table Mountain, between the Woodhead and Hely-Hutchinson Reservoirs, in Cape Town, South Africa. The museum was founded in 1972 by Terence Timoney, a retired waterworks engineer. The museum houses a display of memorabilia from the construction of the dams on Table Mountain which include a beautifully restored narrow gauge steam engine. It has an interesting display of original equipment, hand tools, instruments and photographs and includes the original well-preserved steam locomotive used to haul equipment from the old cableway at Kasteelspoort.

References 

Museums in Cape Town
Technology museums
1972 establishments in South Africa
Museums established in 1972